Desert Solitaire (1989) is a collaborative album by American ambient musicians Steve Roach, Kevin Braheny, and Michael Stearns. This album was conceived as a follow up to Roach and Braheny's 1987 collaboration Western Spaces.

The title of the album is named after the eponymous book by U.S. author Edward Abbey, who died the same year and to whom the album is dedicated.

Track listing
 "Flatlands" (Roach) (4:49)
 "Labyrinth" (Sterns) (6:56)
 "Specter" (Roach) (9:34)
 "The Canyon's Embrace" (Roach, Stearns) (3:35)
 "Cloud of Promise" (Roach, Stearns) (6:38)
 "Knowledge & Dust" (Braheny) (3:23)
 "Shiprock" (Stearns) (4:00)
 "Highnoon" (Roach, Stearns) (10:30)
 "Empty Time" (Braheny) (5:51)
 "From the Heart of Darkness" (Stearns) (3:50)
 "Desert Solitaire" (Roach, Braheny) (6:06)

Personnel
Steve Roach (Oberheim OB8, DMX, Matrix 12, Xpander, Emax, Arp 2600, Korg M-1, Kawai K-5, ocarina, Taos Drum)
Kevin Braheny (The Mighty Serge, Prophet VS, Prophet 2002, soprano saxophone, tin whistle, Diamondback rattlesnake)
Michael Stearns (Roland S-50, D-50, Yamaha TX-7, Oberheim OB8, Serge Modular synthesizer, 12-string guitar)
with
Chuck Oken, Jr. (shakers on “Flatlands”)
Robert Rich (dumbek and gourd drums on “Specter”)
Goergianne Cowan (voice on “Specter”)
Miguel Rivera (effects and ghost percussion on “Labyrinth” and “From the Heart of Darkness”)
Leonice Shinneman (percussion, pakhawaj, manjerra, African berimbau, melodic rattle, claves on “Empty Time”)
Hyman Katz (flute on “From the Heart of Darkness”)

References

1989 albums
Steve Roach (musician) albums
Michael Stearns albums
Collaborative albums